Bob Rogers (January 15, 1923 – December 14, 1995) was an American bobsledder. He competed in the four-man event at the 1964 Winter Olympics.

References

1923 births
1995 deaths
American male bobsledders
Olympic bobsledders of the United States
Bobsledders at the 1964 Winter Olympics
People from Saranac Lake, New York